The North Dakota Soccer Association is the governing body of soccer in the state of North Dakota.

References

External links
 

State Soccer Associations
Soccer in North Dakota
1985 establishments in North Dakota
Organizations based in North Dakota
Sports organizations established in 1985
Organizations based in Dickinson, North Dakota